Galea is a surname of Maltese origin. It is also common to parts of Spain and southern Italy. Notable people with the surname include:

Aloisio Galea (1851–1905), Maltese theologian and minor philosopher
Anthony Galea, Canadian sports medicine specialist
Ben Galea, (born 1978), Australian professional rugby league footballer
Carol Galea, (born 1962), Maltese long-distance runner
Ċensu Galea, (born 1956), Maltese politician
Danny Galea, (born 1983), Australian rugby league player
Emanuel Galea (1891–1974), Maltese Roman Catholic bishop and academic
Guze Galea, (1901–1978), Maltese doctor and author
James Galea, Australian magician and actor
Lino Galea, (born 1976), Maltese footballer
Louis Galea, Maltese representative on the European Court of Auditors
Ludwig Galea, Maltese singer
Stefan Galea, Maltese singer
Michael Galea, (born 1979), Maltese footballer
Paul Galea, Australian rugby league player
Robert Galea, Maltese-Australian Roman Catholic priest and singer/songwriter
Sandro Galea, Maltese-American epidemiologist and public health leader, Dean, Boston University School of Public Health

Maltese-language surnames